Tranquillinus can refer to:

Tranquillinus, bishop of Tarragona (6th century).
Saint Tranquillinus, father of Saints Mark and Marcellian (3rd century)